Suessenguthia is a genus of the Acanthaceae plant family comprising six species of shrubs with showy, tubular flowers arranged in few-flowered heads. It occurs in the lowlands and Andean foothills of southern Peru, Bolivia, and the Brazilian state of Acre, often growing in small groups along rivers.

Suessenguthia is similar to and closely related to the better known and larger genus Sanchezia.

Suessenguthia multisetosa (Rusby) Wasshausen & J.R.I. Wood from eastern Bolivia is one of the more known species as it is cultivated for ornamental use.

References 
Schmidt-Lebuhn, A.N. (2003). A taxonomic revision of the genus Suessenguthia Merxm. (Acanthaceae). Candollea 58: 101–128.
Schmidt-Lebuhn, A.N., M. Kessler & J. Müller (2005). Evolution of Suessenguthia (Acanthaceae) inferred from morphology, AFLP data, and ITS rDNA sequences. Organisms, Diversity & Evolution 5: 1–13.

External links 
Tree of Life Project

Acanthaceae
Acanthaceae genera